The  are a group of volcanic deserted islands located in the Philippine Sea approximately  south of Tokyo and  west of Miyake-jima, in the northern portion of the Izu archipelago, Japan.

Geography
Ōnohara-jima consists of nine main islets and several smaller rocks and stacks. The island is the remnant of an andesite lava dome with sheer sides, the only visible portion of a submarine volcanic caldera.

Located in the Kuroshio Current, the area has abundant sea life, and is popular with sports fishermen and scuba divers.

During the Korean War, aircraft of the US Air Force used Ōnohara-jima as a bombing range, endangering the Japanese murrelet, a rare seabird. The bombing was stopped after Jack Moyer wrote a letter to an associate of then-US President Harry S. Truman.

See also

 Izu Islands
 Desert island
 List of islands

References

External links

Quaternary Volcanoes in Japan

Izu Islands
Uninhabited islands of Japan
Extinct volcanoes
Stacks of Japan
Islands of Tokyo
Pleistocene lava domes